Dongguan–Huizhou intercity railway, also known as the Guanhui intercity railway or Guanhui City Railway, is a regional railway within Guangdong province, China. It runs between the cities of Dongguan and Huizhou in the Pearl River Delta (PRD). Part of a larger radiating intercity rail transit network, called Pearl River Delta Metropolitan Region intercity railway, across the PRD region, directly connecting with the Guangzhou–Shenzhen intercity railway and the planned Foshan–Dongguan intercity railway. The construction period is planned to take three and a half years. 3 renovated and 14 new stations are being built along the route. The Xiaojinkou–Changping East section started operations on 30 March 2016.

History
 8 May 2009 – Construction in Changping, Dongguan officially started, with an original expectation to be opened for traffic by 2013.
 7 June 2013 – Construction is completed and test runs are due to begin in 2014 with whole project opened by the end of 2015.
 30 March 2016 – Xiaojinkou–Changping East section started operations.
 28 December 2017 – Changping East–Daojiao started operations.

Scandal
Songshan station jerry incident a man surnamed Liu broke the construction side of the Songshan Lake station to cut corners, but the construction company building the site pay a prescription charge of Mr. Yang Zhenggang Songshanhu report indicates that this is malicious, and communicate the results to identify after the fact.

Route
Guanhui intercity railway is an East-West railway that starts in the Changzhou area of Dongguan at Dongguan West railway station, this will be a major interchange with the Guangzhou–Shenzhen intercity railway and the planned Foshan–Dongguan intercity railway, plus Dongguang Metro's Line 1. It then moves westward through the Dongguan regions of Daojiao, then Nancheng, Dongcheng, Liaobu, Songshan Lake, Dalang, Changping and Xiegang. Crossing into Huizhou's Huicheng District it then passes through Lilin, Chenjiang and Huihuan before arriving at Huizhou railway station.

Station
Originally approved to build 16 stations, the Huizhou Municipal Railway Construction Investment Group Co. Ltd and the Guangzhou Railway Company agreed to build an additional station at Huizhou's West Lake.

Future
The extension will continue from Xiaojinkou railway station to the currently under construction Huizhou North railway station.

References

High-speed railway lines in China
Rail transport in Guangdong
Railway lines opened in 2016
25 kV AC railway electrification